Molecular Spectra and Molecular Structure IV. Constants of Diatomic Molecules, by K. P. Huber and Gerhard Herzberg (Van nostrand Reinhold company, New York, 1979), is a classic comprehensive multidisciplinary reference text contains a critical compilation of available data for all diatomic molecules and ions known at the time of publication - over 900 diatomic species in all - including electronic energies, vibrational and rotational constants, and observed transitions. Extensive footnotes discuss the reliability of these data and additional detailed informationon potential energy curves, spin-coupling constants, /\-type doubling, perturbations between electronic states, hyperfine structure, rotational g factors, dipole moments, radiative lifetimes, oscillator strengths, dissociation energies and ionization potentials when available, and other aspects. Herzberg received the 1971 Nobel Prize in Chemistry; both authors are world-renowned highly respected scientists.

Discusses
Physics, engineering, mathematics, kinetics, spectroscopy, astronomy, astrophysics, aeronautics, astronautics, radiation, optics, energy, photometry, spectrometry, electromagnetics, oscillators, thermochemistry, thermodynamics, ionization, X-rays, ESR, photoelectrons, electronics, industry, science and technology.

References

Science books